Patriarch Maximus or Patriarch Maximos may refer to:

 Maximus I of Constantinople, Patriarch in 380
 Maximus II of Antioch, Patriarch of Antioch in 449–455
 Maximus II of Constantinople, Ecumenical Patriarch in 1216
 Maximos II Hakim, Patriarch of the Melkite Greek Catholic Church in 1760–1761
 Maximus III of Jerusalem, ruled in 335–350
 Maximus III of Constantinople, Ecumenical Patriarch in 1476–1482
 Maximos III Mazloum, Patriarch of the Melkite Greek Catholic Church in 1833–1855
 Maximus IV of Constantinople, Ecumenical Patriarch in 1491–1497
 Maximos IV Sayegh, patriarch of the Melkite Greek Catholic Church in 1948–1967
 Maximus V of Constantinople, Ecumenical Patriarch in 1946–1948
 Maximos V Hakim, Melkite Greek Catholic Patriarch in 1967–2000

See also
 Patriarch (disambiguation)
 Maximus (disambiguation)
 Maxim (disambiguation)